Paul Podolay (born 30 May 1946) is a German politician. Born in Bratislava, he represents Alternative for Germany (AfD). Paul Podolay has served as a member of the Bundestag from the state of Bavaria since 2017.

Life 
He became member of the bundestag after the 2017 German federal election. He is a member of the Committee on Health and Foreign Affairs.

References

External links 

  
 Bundestag biography 

1946 births
Living people
Members of the Bundestag for Bavaria
Members of the Bundestag 2017–2021
Members of the Bundestag for the Alternative for Germany
Politicians from Bratislava
German people of Slovak descent